Lyashenko or Liashenko is a Ukrainian surname. Notable people with the surname include:

 Andriy Lyashenko (born 1998), Ukrainian footballer
 Elena Liashenko (born 1976), Ukrainian figure skater
 Liudmyla Liashenko (born 1993), Ukrainian skier and biathlete
 Roman Lyashenko (1979–2003), Russian ice hockey player
 Valentina Liashenko (born 1981), Georgian high jumper

See also
 
 

Ukrainian-language surnames